Albertus is a given name. Notable people with the name include:

Latinized names
Aldberht or Albertus (died between 781 and 786), Bishop of Hereford
Albertus Parisiensis (died 1177), French cantor and composer
Albertus de Pisa (died 1240), Italian Franciscan friar
Albertus Stadensis (c.1187–c.1265), German Benedictine chronicler
Albertus Magnus (circa 1200–1280), German Dominican friar and bishop
Albertus de Saxonia (c.1320–1390), German philosopher
Albertus Pictor (c.1440-c.1507), Swedish painter
Albertus de Brudzewo (c.1445–c.1497), Polish astronomer, mathematician, philosopher and diplomat
Birth names
Albertus Boom (born 1938), Dutch cyclist
Albertus Jonas Brandt (1787–1821), Dutch still life painter
Albertus Brondgeest (1786–1849), Dutch art trader, drawer and landscape painter
Albertus Theodore Briggs (1862–1937), American Methodist minister
Albertus Bryne (circa 1621–1668), English organist and composer
Albertus Carpentier Alting (born 1954), Netherlands Antilles luger and bobsledder
Albertus W. Catlin (1868-1933), US Marine Corps brigadier general and Medal of Honor recipient
Albertus Clouwet (1636–1679), Flemish engraver
Albertus Jacobus Duymaer van Twist (1809–1887), Governor-General of the Dutch East Indies
Albertus Eckhoff (1875–1949), New Zealand cricketer
Albertus Geldermans (born 1935), Dutch racing cyclist
Albertus Klijn (1923–2012), Dutch biblical scholar
Albertus Morton (c.1584–1625), English diplomat and Secretary of State
Albertus van Naamen van Eemnes (1828-1902), Dutch politician and lawyer
Albertus Antonie Nijland (1868-1936), Dutch astronomer
Albertus Perk (1887–1919), Dutch fencer
Albertus van Raalte (1811-1876), Dutch-born pastor of the Reformed Church of America
Albertus John Rooks (1869–1958), American college president
Albertus Seba (1665-1736), Dutch pharmacist, zoologist and collector
Albertus Willem Sijthoff (1829-1913), prominent Dutch publisher
Albertus Soegijapranata (1896-1963), first Indonesian native Roman Catholic archbishop
Albertus Susanto Njoto (born 1976), Hong Kong badminton player
Albertus Swanepoel (born 1959), South African fashion designer
Albertus Van Loon, Dutch settler and owner of the Albertus Van Loon House
Albertus Wielsma (1883–1968), Dutch rower
Albertus Henricus Wiese (1761-1810), Governor-General of the Dutch East Indies

See also
Albert (given name)

Dutch masculine given names